Sahasame Jeevitham is a 1984 Indian Telugu-language romance film directed by Bharati-Vasu. It stars Nandamuri Balakrishna and Vijji, with music composed by Ilaiyaraaja. The film is the debut of Balakrishna as a solo lead role without his father N. T. Rama Rao.

Plot 
The film begins with a dynamic youth Ravi going back to his hometown. During the train journey, he is ecstatic and narrates his past to passengers. Ravi led a splendid lifestyle in his college days and is fascinated by everyone because of his fabulous singing. He is the son of a middle-class lecturer Satyam, who daily takes up a bus and many boards to hear his song. Chaaya his fellow collegian daughter of a tycoon Gupta, gets wise of Ravi's knack. So, she climbs the bus in a burka as Gupta shows hostility to pennilessness. Anyhow, Ravi detects and finds her whereabouts with his wit and two crush brainily by a code language. After a few comic scenes, Gupta is cognizant of the ongoing, impedes, threatens Satyam, and contracts a status barrier between turtle doves. Plus, he transits Chaaya to Madras. Besides, Satyam forewarns Ravi to back off his love which he doesn't bear in mind.

Moreover, he proceeds to Madras via his patrons and two flies persist in their love. Thus, the infuriated Gupta makes Ravi apprehended with his influence. Satyam acquits him when a heated row passes that ends with Ravi quitting the house and his friends are all they care about him. Presently, Gupta seizes and fixes to send Chaaya foreign. Being aware of it, Ravi conducts an agitation for love with students as a pillar which ensues chaos. At long last, Gupta steps forward bowing down before the holy love. Apart from, he complying with the condition that he going to knit them when Ravi becomes capable of attaining something. As of today, Ravi is returning after triumphing as a scholar. At last, Chaaya and his friends give him a warm welcome at the station. Finally, the movie ends on a happy note with the marriage of Ravi & Chaaya.

Cast 
Nandamuri Balakrishna as Ravi
Vijji as Chaaya
Jaggayya as Gupta
Prabhakar Reddy as Satyam
Nagesh as Bus Conductor Babu Rao
Thyagaraju as Gupta's brother-in-law
C. H. Krishna Murthy as Driver Rayudu
Hema Sundar as Manager
Dileep as Dillep
Rama Prabha as Babu Rao's wife
M. Varalakshmi
Jayavani

Soundtrack 
Music composed by Ilaiyaraaja. Lyrics were written by Veturi.

References

External links 
 

1980s Telugu-language films
1984 films
Films directed by P. Vasu
Films directed by Santhana Bharathi
Films scored by Ilaiyaraaja